Andrey Lebedzew (born 1 February 1991) is a Belarusian professional footballer who plays for Minsk.

Honours
Dinamo Brest
Belarusian Cup winner: 2016–17, 2017–18
Belarusian Super Cup winner: 2018

External links 

1991 births
Living people
Sportspeople from Vitebsk
Belarusian footballers
Belarusian expatriate footballers
Expatriate footballers in Austria
Expatriate footballers in Kazakhstan
Belarusian expatriate sportspeople in Austria
Association football defenders
FC Vitebsk players
SK Rapid Wien players
FC Lustenau players
First Vienna FC players
FC Naftan Novopolotsk players
FC Dynamo Brest players
FC Zhetysu players
FC Minsk players